Malika Umazheva (1937–2002), a former school teacher, was the former head of the pro-Moscow administration of the Chechen village Alkhan-Kala. Umazheva was an outspoken critic of unlawful zachistka ("cleansing") raids that Russian forces conducted in her village and had had several confrontations with a high-ranking Russian federal officers during the months prior to her death. She also worked closely with the Russian-Chechen Friendship Society. 

According to Memorial investigators, Umazheva was killed by a group of Russian special forces soldiers wearing camouflage uniforms and armed with VSS Vintorez silenced sniper rifles, who arrived at the village in an armoured vehicle and a military truck on the night of 29–30 November 2002. The soldiers broke into her home, where she lived with her son and two adopted daughters, and took her outside. Umazheva's body was discovered by the villagers soon after.

On 4 December 2002 a correspondent for Radio Liberty reported:

"More than 4,000 residents of the Chechen Republic gathered today for the funeral of Malika Umazheva in the settlement of Alkhan-Kala, and almost all of them signed an appeal to the [pro-Moscow] leadership and procuracy of the republic asking that they locate and punish those guilty of murdering a courageous Chechen woman who, despite all the threats from the Russian special services, the MVD, and the soldiers of the Combined Group of Forces in Chechnya, always stood in defense of the rights of the populace of Alkhan-Kala, documenting all illegal actions committed by the soldiers during their many special operations and raids on that population point."

In a tribute to the slain Umazheva, her friend Anna Politkovskaya wrote in Novaya Gazeta on the next day: 

"Malika was a true heroine, a unique and marvelous one. She became the head of administration of one of the most complex Chechen villages—Alkhan-Kala (a 'Baraev' village, the subject of endless 'cleansing operations,' executions and disfigured corpses) after the former head had been murdered. Reason would have told her: 'Sit quietly. Be careful.' But she did the exact opposite—she became the boldest and most committed village head in that murderous zone of military anarchy which today is Chechnya. By herself, unarmed, she went out to meet the [Russian] tanks that were crawling into the village. Alone, she shouted to the generals who had deceived her and, on the sly, were murdering the residents of the village: 'You scoundrels!' She relentlessly fought for a better fate for Alkhan-Kala. No one else permitted himself to do that in present-day Chechnya. Not a single male. She, a humble village head who had been elected by a popular assembly earned the wild hatred of the chief of our General Staff, the much-decorated General Kvashnin. He hated her so much that he invented the vilest stories about her, using his access to the television cameras to spread them. And she? She continued along her chosen path and, in response to Kvashnin's lies, she sued him in court, knowing perfectly well that almost everyone is afraid of him.... But Kvashnin does not forgive those who do not fear him."

Further reading
Khassan Baiev. The Oath: A Surgeon Under Fire. Walker & Company. 2004. .
Politkovskaya, Anna (2003) A Dirty War: A Russian reporter in Chechnya
Politkovskaya, Anna (2003) A Small Corner of Hell: Dispatches from Chechnya

References

External links
"Mopping-up" in the village Alkhan-Kala 11-15 April 2002 (Memorial)
Grozny Village district. Assassination of former head of Alkhan-Kala administration Malika Umazheva (Russian-Chechen Friendship Society)
A brazen war crime by Russian forces in Chechnya (The Jamestown Foundation)
The Risk of Speaking Out: Attacks on Human Rights Defenders in the context of the armed conflict in Chechnya (Amnesty International)

1937 births
2002 deaths
Chechen human rights activists
Women human rights activists
Chechen murder victims
Russian schoolteachers
Chechen victims of human rights abuses
Deaths by firearm in Russia
People murdered in Russia
Russian people of Chechen descent
Women in the Chechen wars
Soviet schoolteachers